Donovan Lake is a lake in Benton County, Minnesota, in the United States.

Donovan Lake was named for John Donovan, a farmer who settled nearby.

See also
List of rivers of Minnesota

References

Lakes of Minnesota
Lakes of Benton County, Minnesota